The Women's artistic gymnastics balance beam competition at the 2015 European Games was held in the National Gymnastics Arena, Baku on 20 June 2015.

Medalists

Qualification

The top six gymnasts with one per country advanced to the final.

Results

References 

Gymnastics at the 2015 European Games
2015 in women's gymnastics